Pelochyta joseensis is a moth of the family Erebidae. It was described by Embrik Strand in 1921. It is found in Costa Rica.

References

Pelochyta
Moths described in 1921